The men's team foil was one of seven fencing events on the fencing at the 1952 Summer Olympics programme. It was the eighth appearance of the event. The competition was held from 21 to 22 July 1952. 77 fencers from 15 nations competed.

Results
Source: Official results; and Sports Reference

Round 1
The top two nations in each pool advanced to the quarter finals.

Round 2
The top two nations in each pool advanced to the semi-finals.

Semifinals
The top two nations in each pool advanced to the final.

Final
The final was a round-robin.

Results

 8-6  
 12-4 
 15-1 
 13-3 
 15-1 
 9-6

Rosters

Argentina
 Fulvio Galimi
 José Rodríguez
 Eduardo Sastre
 Félix Galimi
 Santiago Massini

Australia
 Charles Stanmore
 John Fethers
 Jock Gibson
 Ivan Lund

Belgium
 Pierre Van Houdt
 André Verhalle
 Alex Bourgeois
 Paul Valcke
 Édouard Yves
 Gustave Ballister

Egypt
 Salah Dessouki
 Mohamed Ali Riad
 Osman Abdel Hafeez
 Mahmoud Younes
 Mohamed Zulficar
 Hassan Hosni Tawfik

France
 Claude Netter
 Jéhan Buhan
 Jacques Lataste
 Jacques Noël
 Christian d'Oriola
 Adrien Rommel

Germany
 Willy Fascher
 Kurt Wahl
 Norman Casmir
 Julius Eisenecker
 Siegfried Rossner

Great Britain
 René Paul
 Luke Wendon
 Emrys Lloyd
 Raymond Paul
 Harry Cooke
 Allan Jay

Hungary
 Endre Tilli
 Aladár Gerevich
 Endre Palócz
 Lajos Maszlay
 Tibor Berczelly
 József Sákovics

Italy
 Edoardo Mangiarotti
 Manlio Di Rosa
 Giancarlo Bergamini
 Antonio Spallino
 Giorgio Pellini
 Renzo Nostini

Romania
 Andrei Vîlcea
 Ilie Tudor
 Nicolae Marinescu
 Vasile Chelaru

Saar
 Ernst Rau
 Walter Brödel
 Karl Bach
 Günther Knödler

Soviet Union
 Ivan Komarov
 German Bokun
 Yulen Uralov
 Mark Midler

Sweden
 Rolf Magnusson
 Sven Fahlman
 Nils Rydström
 Bo Eriksson

United States
 Silvio Giolito
 Albie Axelrod
 Nate Lubell
 Byron Krieger
 Daniel Bukantz
 Hal Goldsmith

Venezuela
 Giovanni Bertorelli
 Nelson Nieves
 Juan Kavanagh
 Gustavo Gutiérrez
 Augusto Gutiérrez

References

Foil team
Men's events at the 1952 Summer Olympics